Kristina and Karissa Shannon (born October 2, 1989 in Ann Arbor, Michigan) are American Playboy Playmates and twin sisters.

Career
In 2008, the Shannons moved into the Playboy Mansion as two of Hugh Hefner's three new girlfriends; because of their relationship with Hefner, the Shannons began appearing on the E! network reality television series The Girls Next Door. Despite their "girlfriend" status, Karissa said the relationship she and Kristina shared with Hefner was more for fun and the opportunity to be on the show, rather than romance. The first episode they appeared in attracted 2.4 million viewers, making it the most-watched season premiere in the show's history; five weeks after the premiere, ratings had dropped to 919,000.

The Shannons appeared as Miss July and Miss August 2009 in the combined "summer issue" of Playboy magazine; the double issue was necessitated by financial problems at the publisher. Unlike previous centerfold twins, they managed to earn two consecutive months as Playmates, but shared a single centerfold. By January 2010, the Shannon twins moved out of the mansion, though they continued to appear in The Girls Next Door.

The twins had small roles in Somewhere, a film directed by Sofia Coppola which won top honors at the 67th Venice International Film Festival in 2010.

In 2010, Karissa Shannon attracted some publicity by confirming she had been involved in sex tapes with Spencer Pratt and Heidi Montag. One sex tape of her and boyfriend actor Sam Jones III was released on DVD by Vivid Entertainment in October 2010 as Karissa Shannon Superstar. In 2011, Karissa and Sam Jones III released the song "Juice and Vodka", which is available on iTunes.

On January 5, 2012, the twins participated in the ninth series of the UK reality show, Celebrity Big Brother in which they came fifth. They also appeared on the companion series to the show, Big Brother's Bit on the Side.

On February 17, 2019, Brazzers released a scene with the Shannons. A few months later Brazzers released another video with them.

Personal lives
The twins were raised in Clearwater Beach, Florida and attended Largo High School for a time.

Legal issues
Karissa was arrested on a misdemeanor battery charge in November 2007.

The Shannons were both charged in January 2008 with aggravated battery after reportedly fighting with two others at a house party. The assistant state attorney filed the charge as felony battery. After pleading no contest, they were put on probation and required to pay restitution.

In January 2016, Kristina was arrested for DUI after driving drunk on the way to get a nipple piercing.

In 2017, Karissa was arrested for felony domestic violence and Kristina was arrested for misdemeanor violence after Kristina punched Karissa in the face and Karissa threw an ADT security monitor at her sister, knocking out her teeth.

Filmography

References

External links

Identical twins
Participants in American reality television series
People from Ann Arbor, Michigan
American twins
1989 births
Living people
Twin models
2000s Playboy Playmates
American pornographic film actresses
People from Clearwater, Florida
People from Largo, Florida
Models from Florida
Pornographic film actors from Florida